You're Ugly Too is a 2015 Irish drama film directed and written by Mark Noonan.

Synopsis

Will receives parole from prison to care for his 11-year-old niece Stacey, who has been orphaned after the death of her widowed mother, Will's sister. As they head towards the Irish midlands and try to be a family, they encounter a series of obstacles. Stacey is rejected at the local school because she suffers from narcolepsy, a condition she has recently developed. Will, who repeatedly disobeys the parole conditions in his disastrous attempts to be a responsible father figure, has to find employment and prove that he can provide a stable environment for Stacey, before it is officially decided whether or not Stacey returns to the foster system and Will to prison to complete his sentence.

Cast
 Aidan Gillen as Will
 Lauren Kinsella as Stacey
 Simon McQuaid as Barman
 Jesse Morris as Angry Driver
 George Piştereanu as Tibor
 Erika Sainte as Emilie
 Steve Wall as Lawyer

References

External links
 
 
 

2015 films
Irish drama films
2010s English-language films

2015 drama films